Booker is a 1984 American biographical short television film directed by Stan Lathan, and starring Shavar Ross, CCH Pounder, Thalmus Rasulala, Shelley Duvall, and Judge Reinhold. Its plot follows the early life of civil rights activist Booker T. Washington. The film first screened on the Disney Channel on October 1, 1984.

Cast
Shavar Ross as Booker T. Washington
CCH Pounder as Jane
Thalmus Rasulala as Wash
James Bond III as John
Shelley Duvall as Laura Burroughs
Judge Reinhold as Newt Burroughs
Julius Harris as Lee
LeVar Burton as William Davis
Mel Stewart as Reverend Rice
Marian Mercer as Mrs. Ruffner

References

External links
 

1984 films
1984 television films
Cultural depictions of Booker T. Washington
Disney Channel original films
Films set in the 1860s
Films directed by Stan Lathan
1980s American films